Rev. Ab. Jeremias Schröder OSB (born 8 December 1964 as Maximilian Schröder in Bad Wörishofen) is the Archabbot President of the Congregation of Sankt Ottilien.

Archabbot Jeremias Schröder was born on 8 December 1964 in Bad Wörishofen. His father was merchant and his mother chemist. He grew up in Bad Wörishofen and Dorschhausen. He graduated from the Gymnasium in 1984 where he had a focus on modern languages. Then he joined the St. Ottilien Archabbey. After the novitiate he took his vows to join the order in 1985. From 1985 to 1990 he studied philosophy and theology in Rome and from 1990 to 1994 history in Oxford. In 1992 Schröder was ordained to the priesthood. From 1992 he was also "spiritual" (spiritual assistant) of the Benedictine Sisters of Stanbrook.
From 1994 to 2000 he was in the St. Ottilien Archabbey secretary of archabbot Notker Wolf, zelator, keeper of the archives and editor of the magazine "Missionsblätter" and of the yearbook of St. Ottilien ("Jahrbuch St. Ottilien"). Furthermore, he was engaged in the involvements of his order in China. In October 2000 he was elected as archabbot of the St. Ottilien Archabbey. As archabbot he was also the leader of the congregation of Missionary Benedictines. In 2012 the personal union of the two positions was split and he resigned from the leadership of the abbey but remained praeses of the Ottilien Congregation.

Fourteenth Ordinary General Assembly of the Synod of Bishops
Jeremias Schröder was selected to take part at the synod as one of the elected representatives of the Union Of Superiors General. He reported that the Catholic fraternal orders considered before the synod to give half of their ten seats to the female orders that are not eligible to vote. However, the Unione Superiori Generali finally concluded that it would be not enough if the female orders should get seats of the fraternal orders but that they should get their own seats.

References

|-

 	

Benedictine abbots
German abbots
Living people
1964 births
People from Unterallgäu